Javaune Marie Adams-Gaston is an American psychologist and academic administrator. She is the seventh president of Norfolk State University.

Life 
Adams-Gaston completed a Ph.D. at Iowa State University. She has published multiple articles during her career. 

Adams-Gaston had a practice for 25 years as a licensed psychologist and as an educator. At the University of Maryland, Adams-Gaston held numerous positions including psychologist, associate dean in academic affairs, assistant athletic director, equity administrator, and graduate faculty member.

Adams-Gaston worked as the senior vice president for student life at Ohio State University.

Adams-Gaston became the seventh president of Norfolk State University (NSU) in June 2019. She succeeded interim president Melvin Stith. She has advocated for increased financial support for the benefit of students, faculty, and staff and the stability of the institution. Adams-Gaston influenced the receipt of a $40 million gift from philanthropist MacKenzie Scott, the largest single gift in NSU’s history. She has led the university in successful efforts to secure grants and partnerships from corporations such as Microsoft, Netflix, Apple, IBM, Dominion Energy, and others.

In March 2022, Adams-Gaston was one of 18 appointees to U.S. president Joe Biden's board of advisors on Historically black colleges and universities.

References 

Living people
Year of birth missing (living people)
Place of birth missing (living people)
21st-century American psychologists
Heads of universities and colleges in the United States
Norfolk State University faculty
African-American academic administrators
African-American psychologists
American women psychologists
African-American women scientists
21st-century American women scientists
Iowa State University alumni
University of Maryland, College Park faculty
Ohio State University faculty
African-American women academic administrators
Women heads of universities and colleges